Bezhta (or alternatively Bezheta, also called Kapucha or Kapuchin) could refer to:
the Bezhta language
the Bezhta people

See also
"kapuchin" may be a misspelling of capuchin, a New World monkey of the genus Cebus, an order of Roman Catholic friars, among other meanings.